Brigadier General (Retd) SK Abu Bakr is a Bangladesh Awami League politician and the former Member of Parliament of Narail-2.

Career
Bakr was elected to parliament from Narail-2 as a Bangladesh Awami League candidate in 2008.

References

Awami League politicians
Living people
9th Jatiya Sangsad members
Year of birth missing (living people)